Peter Batey (贝彼德) CMG OBE (born 1 July 1958) is a British businessman working in China. He is Chairman and co-founder of Vermilion Partners Ltd, a merger and acquisitions and strategic advisory firm focused on China. Batey has served with numerous organisations promoting business ties between China and the UK, receiving an OBE for services to Sino-British investment and trade in 1997, and a CMG for services to UK-China relations in 2015.

Biography

Education and early life 

Batey studied Philosophy, Politics and Economics (PPE) at Keble College, Oxford. He took a sabbatical year in 1979 to undertake the role of President of the Oxford University Student Union, before graduating in 1981. Following graduation, he joined Citibank NA as an executive trainee.  From 1982 to 1986 he was political private secretary\ to the Rt. Hon. Sir Edward Heath, KG, MBE, the Prime Minister who restored diplomatic relations between the United Kingdom and China.

Career 
Batey moved to Beijing in 1986 as a representative of  Arthur Andersen, subsequently becoming Chief Representative for China.  In 1989 he and Richard Burn co-founded Batey Burn, a China-focused investment advisory and government relations business.

In 1999 Batey became Chairman of APCO Asia Ltd after APCO acquired Batey Burn. Batey left APCO Asia Ltd in 2004 and co-founded Vermilion Partners Ltd, where he serves as Chairman.

He was a director of Shuijingfang, a public company listed on the Shanghai Stock Exchange as a nominee of Diageo Plc from 2007-2013, and serves as a director of a number of foreign-invested enterprises in China.

Batey has served in numerous roles in organisations focused on the development of business and political ties between China, and the UK and Europe, including: Chairman of the British Chamber of Commerce in China (1994–1996), Vice President and President of the European Union Chamber of Commerce in China, which he helped to establish, from 1999–2002, Senior Advisor to the Lord Mayor and Corporation of the City of London (2006–2008), as well as Chairman of the Great Britain China Centre (2004 – 2014); Since 2012 he has been Vice Chairman and Chairman of the Nominations Committee of the China Britain Business Council, having previously served as a member of the Board and the Executive Committee (2001 – present).

Awards
Batey was awarded the Order of the British Empire for services to Sino-British investment and trade in the Queen’s Birthday Honours List in June 1997, and became a Companion of the Order of St Michael and St George in the 2015 Birthday Honours for services to Sino-British relations.

References

External links
Vermilion Homepage

1958 births
Living people
Alumni of Keble College, Oxford
British businesspeople
Companions of the Order of St Michael and St George
Officers of the Order of the British Empire